is a Japanese freestyle skier. He competed in the men's moguls event at the 1992 Winter Olympics.

References

1964 births
Living people
Japanese male freestyle skiers
Olympic freestyle skiers of Japan
Freestyle skiers at the 1992 Winter Olympics
Sportspeople from Hokkaido